The Prismatic World Tour was the third concert tour by American singer Katy Perry, in support of her fourth studio album, Prism (2013). The tour began on May 7, 2014, in Belfast, Northern Ireland at the Odyssey Arena, concluding on October 18, 2015, in Alajuela, Costa Rica at Parque Viva after six legs. The Prismatic World Tour grossed more than $204.3 million from 149 shows with a total attendance of 1,984,503 between 2014 and 2015 and it is Perry's most successful tour to date.

Production
Perry first teased the tour during her "We Can Survive" event at the Hollywood Bowl on October 23, 2013, where she encouraged fans to see her on her 2014 tour, stating that it would be "magical". She told Entertainment Weekly that "The tour is going to be fantastic. I always try to take it to the next level. I think people will realize what the tour is going to be like when they listen to the music." She also emphasized that she would be "very close" to the audience during the tour. At the 2013 MTV Europe Music Awards, Perry said the show would be "less cartoony" than the California Dreams Tour and would be a "feast for your eyes". Perry told Capital FM in December 2013 that the tour has a less of a storyline than her previous endeavors, saying:
I'm going to bring all the bells and whistles like it was last time but it won't be so highly narrated. I just want a little bit more room to express myself ... I'm just really excited. I just did a big tour meeting yesterday and saw the graphic drawing of the stage and it's unlike anything I've seen for any other artist and it's unlike anything I've ever done. It's different, it's fresh, it's clean and it's actually in the middle of the audience.

Over 275 costumes were designed for the tour, including 80 for the dancers. Perry gave designer Marina Toybina intricate details for each outfit's materials, patterns, and designs. According to Toybina, "[Perry's] creative involvement was daily, down to us deciding together on trims, final prints, specific materials and color spectrum for any and all digital artwork".

Perry announced the tour on November 18, 2013, via Twitter. She announced the first leg taking place in Northern Ireland, Scotland, and England along with Icona Pop as the opening act. According to the official press release, the tour is designed to be a "multi-faceted spectacular" and will include a special standing pit around the stage called "The Reflection Section" that will allow Perry to be "closer than ever to her fans." The first leg took place in May 2014. The second leg was announced on January 15, 2014, consisting of concerts in Canada, United States and Mexico. The leg ran from June to October 2014. Ferras opened for Perry in all of the North American dates with the exception of Mexico. Capital Cities opened from June 22, 2014 through August 8, 2014, Kacey Musgraves opened from August 10, 2014 through September 10, 2014, duo Tegan and Sara opened from September 12, 2014 through October 8, 2014, and Becky G opened from October 10 through 18, 2014. The third leg, consisting of shows in Oceania, was announced in February 2014. Betty Who served as the opening act from November 7 through 28, 2014, while Tove Lo opened from November 30 until the end of the leg. The fourth leg was announced on June 2, 2014. It took place from February to March 2015 through Europe and Charli XCX opened the shows. The fifth leg of the tour, consisting of 12 shows, was announced on January 29, 2015, and has taken place in Asia between April and May 2015. Ferras returned as the opening act for Taipei, while The Dolls opened in Guangzhou, Shanghai, Tokyo, Macau, Manila, Jakarta, Singapore, and Bangkok. The sixth and final leg of the tour, consisting of 10 shows, was announced on March 7, 2015, and has taken place in Latin America between September and October 2015. Tinashe served as the opening act in Curitiba, Buenos Aires, Santiago, Bogotá, San Juan, Panama City, and Alajuela. Other opening acts included Gala Brie in Lima, AlunaGeorge in São Paulo, Lali in Buenos Aires, and Durazno in Bogotá. On February 16, 2015, Rock in Rio announced Perry as the main headliner of the festival in Rio de Janeiro.

Costumes

Multiple outfits and costumes are featured throughout the tour. Her first costume, which is worn during the "Prismatic" act, is a silver, mirrored leather skirt, complete with fingerless gloves and matching heels. The neckline, waistline, arms, and bottom of the skirt all are installed with lights that glow during the performance. Perry also has light-up extensions to match her dress for this section. During the "Egyptian" act, Perry wears a hand-embroidered purple leotard, a hand-embellished collar and an ornate purple and gold skirt, complete with thigh-high purple high heel boots. She also wears a blonde wig with black bangs and ends. The "Cat-oure" act has Perry wearing a sparkly, pink, leopard leotard, complete with a tail and a matching pink plastic hat with cat ears and a short black bobbed wig attached to it. The chest and abdomen of the costume are nude colored, and the costume also contains a shimmery belt and collar. For the "Acoustic" act, Perry wears a butterfly-inspired dress, along with a short, silver glittery cape. The dress had a butterfly over the chest, and the bottom of the dress is see-through, also containing butterflies imprinted on it. She also adorns a multi-colored wig, featuring pastel blues, pinks, and greens. The "Throwback" act has Perry emerge on stage wearing a yellow smiley face push-up bra, leggings with yellow peace signs on them, as well as a yellow skirt. For "It Takes Two", Perry wears a Yin-Yang crop top over her smiley face bra and a large Yin-Yang dress that inflates as she rises on the stage. Following "It Takes Two", the Yin-Yang costume is removed and Perry now wears a yellow leather jacket with a smiley face on the back and sunglasses. The "Hyper Neon" act follows, where Perry wears a green palm tree-inspired bra, high waisted underwear containing palm tree decor around it, and pink heels with thigh-high socks on. After exiting and returning to perform "Birthday", Perry emerges wearing a full-body, skin-colored leotard. The leotard features many birthday-themed items on it, such as balloons over the breasts, a cake over her pubic region, a bow on the buttocks, confetti, and glitter everywhere, as well as 'Happy Birthday' embroidered on the back of it. During the entire "Hyper Neon" act, Perry wears a green ombre wig, that is dark towards the top, and transitions into a more lime green towards the tip. The wig is also pulled down into small buns. For the "Encore", Perry emerges with a long black wig and a firework-inspired dress. The corset and pants and heels are both glittery blue, and the corset features fireworks over the breasts. Perry adorns elbow-length blue gloves with fireworks on them. She also wears a dress that straps onto the corset and reveals the front of her body. The dress is orange and features many different fireworks around it.

Costume changes

On May 14, 2014, at LG Arena in Birmingham, England, the Eyptian-inspired Lavender bodysuit and thigh-high boots were replaced with a Red bodysuit & Gladiator sandals during the "Ancient Egyptian" Section of the show. 

For the Asian Leg of the tour, Perry adorned several new costumes. For the "Prismatic" Act, she wore a metallic, purple cat-inspired leotard. The outfit contained metallic, purple thigh-high hell boots, a leotard complete with a cat face, glowing eyes, and little multi-color triangles around the leotard that lit up, similar to her previous outfit. For the "Acoustic" set, Perry now wears a sparkly green dress with sunflowers over the breasts and other parts of the dress. The wig she adorns is also more vibrant in color, and less pastel. For her shows in China, during the "Throwback" and "Hyper Neon" act, Perry wore a pastel splatter paint-inspired mini dress, which was a dress to look as if it had been splattered with paint. After her shows and China, Perry debuted (on tour) a new outfit to replace the splatter paint dress during the same act. This outfit consisted of a leather pink striped crop top bra, which had yellow shoulder pads sticking off of it. She wore leather pink striped cufflets and a pink, yellow and orange striped mini dress, created to look as if it was overlapping on itself – she wore this outfit when performing at the BBC Radio 1 Big Weekend.

Concert synopsis

The show begins with neon-clad dancers emerging on stage. An area of the stage moves to form a pyramid, from which Perry emerges to perform "Roar", wearing a mirrored leather skirt and crop top with neon lights woven into the seams. Towards the end of the song, she and the dancers skip using light-up ropes while the entire arena goes dark. "Part of Me" is the next track to be performed, where she and her dancers sprint down a 15-meter long treadmill. Following Part of Me, a dubstep version of "Wide Awake", during which a triangular section of the stage rises and rotates in the air. She then performs "This Moment", which features multi-colored lasers projected across the stage. This Moment shortly transforms into "Love Me" afterward, followed by Perry exiting the stage. After a video interlude displaying Perry's face created out of stars and planets in space, she appears on stage atop a mechanical horse. During this section of the tour, she wears an Egyptian-themed outfit, completed with a hand-embroidered leotard, a hand-embellished collar, and an ornate purple and gold skirt. Perry performs "Dark Horse", before moving on to "E.T.". A large diamond-shaped structure descends from the ceiling to lift the singer in the air. "Legendary Lovers" is then performed, followed by "I Kissed a Girl", which features dancers dressed as Rubenesque mummies with large breasts and buttocks. They follow Perry around the stage and after she exits, the mummies proceed with their own dance while guitarists are lifted into the air, with sparks shooting from their guitars.

A video interlude shows a cat being transported from the Pyramids of Giza to "Kittywood". Perry emerges on top of a large ball of wool wearing a catsuit, accompanied by her dancers wearing similar cat costumes. A jazz version of "Hot n Cold" is then performed, before Perry begins to perform "International Smile"; the song is intermingled with Madonna's "Vogue". The dancers enact a short scene in which the cats chase a mouse. Perry re-enters, wearing a butterfly-themed dress and cape and performs multiple songs acoustically, including "By the Grace of God", a mash-up of "The One That Got Away" and "Thinking of You", and "Unconditionally".

At the beginning of this section, there is a "Megamix Dance Party", performed by the dancers and backing singers, which is a mix of a selection of songs. Perry arrives on stage wearing a top, skirt, and leggings featuring smiling faces and peace symbols. She performs "Walking on Air", where she is lifted above the stage and flies from one end to the other. Following this, she changes into a yin-yang dress to sing "It Takes Two". While performing the song, she is lifted off the ground while the bottom half of her dress is inflated and covers the lift, to give the apprentice of her being very tall. To close this section of the tour, a mash-up of "This Is How We Do" and "Last Friday Night (T.G.I.F.)" is performed as Perry and her dancers ride an inflatable car on stage. A video interlude is played, showing Perry as a mental patient in a triangular padded cell, before paint splashes from all room areas. She appears on stage wearing a bra and skirt decorated with palm leaves to perform "Teenage Dream". "California Gurls" is then performed with blackout lights and dancers move letters that eventually recreate the Hollywood Sign. Perry exits the stage before re-emerging to sing "Birthday", wearing a one-piece outfit named the "Birthday Suit", decorated with balloons over her breasts and other birthday-themed items. During the performance, Perry brings a member of the audience whose birthday is near the show's date on stage, and they sit on a throne on top of a rotating birthday cake, which emerges from the stage. She is soon trapped in a seat with multiple balloons attached and flies around the entire audience as balloons and confetti descend from above. Soon after, she exits the stage once more after thanking everyone for attending and introducing her band members.

For the encore, an interlude called "Prism-Vision" is played, where the audience is encouraged to wear special rainbow-star diffraction glasses picked up before the show to magnify the visual effects of the performance. Perry enters the stage wearing a firework-themed dress to perform "Firework". During the song's climax, multiple fireworks explode on stage before Perry ends the show, exiting through the pyramid from which she entered the stage at the beginning.

Commercial performance

Ticket sales
The first leg attracted high public demand, resulting in additional shows in Belfast, Glasgow, and London being announced within hours of tickets being released on general sale. Soon after, Perry added extra dates in Manchester and Birmingham. Extra dates in the United States, Canada and Mexico were also added to the second leg of her tour shortly after the leg's first announcement. Due to vast popularity during the pre-sale period, Perry added more shows to the Oceania leg in Melbourne, Sydney, and Brisbane, extending the leg to December. Jesse Lawrence from Forbes reported on the North American leg of the tour, saying that her ticket sales averaged at $252.60 on the secondary market throughout the five-month stint in the country. His analysis concluded that the average price was higher than that of her peers, such as Beyoncé and Lady Gaga, adding "with Prismatic holding one of the highest tour average prices of the summer, the secondary market won't have many dates dropping below a $200 average price."

On Pollstar's Mid Year Top 100 Worldwide Tours list, released in July 2014 and ranking tours up until that date, the Prismatic World Tour ranked at number 26 with $22 million in grosses and 249,716 tickets sold for 22 shows so far. The Prismatic World Tour topped the Billboard Hot Tours weekly recap the week of September 18. The tour topped the chart with $31 million in ticket sales from 21 of the tour's North American concerts that occurred in a two-month span beginning on July 15. In Australia, the tour sold more than 350,000 tickets across 23 dates. It broke the record for most tickets sold at the Allphones Arena, selling a total of 89,500 tickets spanning six shows. Paul Dainty of Dainty Group, the promoters of the Australian leg, stated that ticket demand was so high "we could have added another dozen shows everywhere easily."

Boxscore
The Prismatic World Tour was an international success and became Perry's most successful tour to date. The tour was the second highest-grossing, and highest-grossing led by a female, in North America by average box office gross per city in 2014. According to Pollstar, the tour was the fourth best-selling in the world, and the best-selling by a solo female, in 2014 with a gross of $153 million and 1,407,972 attendees. The tour was highly successful in North America, becoming the 25th best-selling North American tour of all-time with sales of $94.3 million, making it the third best-selling tour in North America of 2014. The tour was also highly successful in Australia, selling 350,000 tickets across the country and breaking Allphones Arena's attendance record with over 89,000 tickets sold at Allphones Arena alone. The tour's success continued into 2015. The Pollstar 2015 Mid-Year Top 100 Worldwide Tour list revealed the Prismatic World Tour as the 23rd highest grosser, with a total of $25.8 million from 35 shows, and a total of 373,133 in attendance. However, Pollstar later adjusted its Mid-Year report, stating that the Prismatic World Tour grossed $35.7 million from 35 international dates in the first half of 2015 instead of $25.8 million. In the other hand, one week later, Billboard reported that the Prismatic World Tour grossed over $41.7 million from 27 shows in the first half of 2015. At the end of 2015, the tour placed 27th on Pollstar's "Top 100 Worldwide Tours", grossing $51 million from 43 dates.

Perry's performances at Melbourne's Rod Laver Arena ranked at number 11 on Pollstar's 2014 Top Year End International Boxoffice list. At the 2014 Billboard Touring Awards, the tour won the award for "Top Package" and was nominated for the "Concert Marketing & Promotion" award. Perry was the seventh most-searched artist on Ticketmaster in 2014.

Critical reception

The tour has been well received by critics. Colin Stutz of Billboard called the performance in Belfast a "spectacle of costumes and colors". Julian Douglas from The Irish Times wrote that Perry "entertained, thrilled, and serenaded" and "oozed professionalism" despite feeling "under the weather". Emilee Lindner from MTV News felt Perry lived up to her previous "promise" of making the concert a "feast for your eyes and for your Instagram", and noted a recurring cat-theme within the show. Mike Wass from Idolator praised the show's costumes and dubbed the show a "candy-colored visual extravaganza". In a review of the one of the Glasgow shows, Matthew Magee from The Daily Telegraph awarded the tour four out of five stars, stating that Perry "made the kind of natural connection with her Glasgow audience that her peers would die for." Richard Clayton of Financial Times gave the show an excellent review, awarding five out of five stars, and described it as "sonically stonking, visually spectacular and fun, fun, fun." Daisy Wyatt from The Independent criticized Perry's vocal ability and stage presence. She awarded the tour three out of five stars. Rolling Stone reviewer Mark Sutherland praised the tour, calling it "loud, garish, camp and never less than uproariously entertaining" and "a show to damage retinas and blow minds."

Jem Aswad of The Village Voice described the show at Madison Square Garden as "Better Than: Every other multimillion-dollar concert I've seen" and commented that "The Prismatic tour, for all its expense and atom-splitting technology, is above all else fun, smart and crowd-pleasing, and I'll take that over the self-serious bombast that usually accompanies shows of this scale any day of the week." Nate Chinen of The New York Times gave the same show a mixed review, saying that he felt the "music was subordinate to the spectacle", though described it as a "Spectacle of Pop Idol Proportions". Pitchfork Media's Lindsay Zoladz commented on one of the shows at New York City's Barclays Center: "I felt about this concert the way I feel about Katy Perry overall: She throws everything she's got at the wall, and every so often hits a bullseye." Three journalists from Pitchfork gave the show a mixed review. Jason Lipshutz of Billboard reviewed the same show positively, saying "the superstar is at the top of her game, and Prismatic's Brooklyn debut shone bright." August Brown from the Los Angeles Times gave the tour a generally positive review, commenting that the "show at the Honda Center proved that Perry's persona is a lasting one", but "the few stumbles came in the presentation." Consequence of Sound's Michael Roffman named Perry one of the Top Live Acts of 2014, saying that with the Prismatic World Tour, "similar to the late King and the still-truckin' Queen of Pop — Michael Jackson and Madonna, respectively — Perry creates an unforgettable event for her legions of fans."

Accolades

Broadcasts and recordings 

Perry's pre-recorded "Birthday" performance at the Newcastle Metro Radio Arena show was aired live during the 2014 Billboard Music Awards ceremony on May 18, 2014. On May 25, 2014 Perry headlined BBC Radio 1's Big Weekend, which was streamed live on the Radio 1 website. It was also broadcast live on BBC Three, BBC HD and BBC Radio 1. Highlights of the event were also broadcast on BBC Three and BBC HD during the week following the Big Weekend. A recorded live performance of "Legends Never Die" with Ferras at the Staples Center was uploaded to Ferras's official YouTube channel on October 11, 2014. Perry's performance during Rock In Rio on September 27, 2015, was broadcast live in Brazil on Multishow, Globo.com, and Gshow, and internationally was streamed live online on LiveXLive.com, AOL.com and AOL app.

It was announced that the final Sydney shows on December 12 and 13, 2014, would be filmed for a concert movie. Almost a year later, on November 23, 2015, it was broadcast on Network Seven. On March 28, 2015, Epix aired a two-hour concert special of the tour, as part of their "Free Preview Weekend". A short video interlude for "Peacock" was broadcast before Perry performed "Teenage Dream". During the exclusive Q&A with Epix, Perry confirmed that she will be making a DVD of the tour. She also revealed that she would change a couple of things for the DVD. Netflix added the tour's concert movie to its streaming service on June 26, 2015. The tour's concert movie was released on DVD, Blu-ray and Digital Download on October 30, 2015. All formats also include 30 minutes of exclusive extras.

Set list 

This set list is from the show on May 30, 2014 in London, England. It does not represent of all concerts for the duration of the tour.

 "Roar"
 "Part of Me"
 "Wide Awake"
 "This Moment" / "Love Me"
 "Dark Horse"
 "E.T."
 "Legendary Lovers"
 "I Kissed a Girl"
 "Hot n Cold"
 "International Smile" / "Vogue"
"By the Grace of God"
 "The One That Got Away" / "Thinking of You"
"Unconditionally"
 "Walking on Air"
 "It Takes Two"
 "This Is How We Do" / "Last Friday Night (T.G.I.F.)"
"Teenage Dream"
 "California Gurls"
 "Birthday"
Encore
 "Firework"

Shows

Personnel

Main 

Baz Halpin – director
Harry Sandler – tour manager
Cindy Chapman – assistant tour manager
Jay Schmit – production manager
Kim Hilton – production coordinator
Kavi Agrawal – production coordinator
Bradford Cobb – tour producers
Steven Jensen – tour producers
Martin Kirkup – tour producers
Ngoc Hoang – tour producers
Alan Doyle – stage manager
John Czajkowski – tour accountant
David Mendoza – set construction
Michael Curry Designs – set construction
Aaron Ford – set construction
Patrick Seeley – set construction
Tamra Natisin – personal assistant
Armando Alarcon – personal trainer
Greenberg Traurig – legal representative
Jay Cooper – legal representative
Steve Plinio – legal representative
Bernie Gudvi – business manager
Jeff Hinkle – business manager
Sandy Cohen – business manager
Emma Banks– booking agent
Mitch Rose– booking agent
Jbeau Lewis– booking agent
Christian Carubi – booking agent
Tina Walters – travel agent
Debbie and Nancy Rosenblatt – travel agent
Lyndsay Thomson – travel agent
Tracy Lonsdale – travel agent
RJ Durell – choreographer
Nick Florez – choreographer
Katie Schaar – assistant choreographer
Todd Delano – hair and make-up
Clyde Haygood – hair and make-up
Larry McDaniel – hair and make-up
Darren Scott – hair and make-up
Erin Lareau – wardrobe
Lisa Nishimura – wardrobe
Laura Spratt – wardrobe
Abby Franklin – wardrobe
Marina Toybina – wardrobe
Tony Villanueva – wardrobe supervisor
Baz Halpin – production design
Kathy Beer – lighting director
John Chiodo – lighting crew chief
Baz Halpin – lighting design
Eric Marchwinski – lighting design
Julian Lavender – lighting design
John Huddleston – lighting design
Bart Buckalew – lighting technology
Tony Cerasuolo – lighting technology
Chris Donati – lighting technology
John Dall – lighting technology
Jamie Catt – lighting technology
Nick Barton – lighting technology
Alex Murphy – lighting technology
Tiffany Hudson – lighting technology
Chuck Melton – head rigger
Ricky Baiotto – riggers
Albert Pozzetti – riggers
Jake Harrelson – riggers
Patrick Leonard – riggers
Duane Burda – backline crew chief
Dan Lefevre – head chef, catering crew chief
Robert Moore – automation
Richard Kent – automation
Simon Parsons – automation
Rick Berger – automation
Michael Berger – automation
Eric Pelletier – automation
Luke Larson – carpenter
Dewey Evans – carpenter
Jimmy George – carpenter
PJ Smith – carpenter
Mike Ryder – carpenter
Vadim Melline – carpenter
Aaron Ford – carpenter
Pete Keppler – engineer
Eric Racy – engineer
Manny Barajas – engineer
Ben Rothstein – engineer
Shaun Barnett – pyrotechnics and lasers
Marc Webber – pyrotechnics and lasers
Ryan Hagan – pyrotechnics and lasers
Dan Ivory-Castle – pyrotechnics and lasers
Ian MacDonald – pyrotechnics and lasers
Michael Morey – pyrotechnics and lasers
Alex Oita – pyrotechnics and lasers
Lightborne – video design
Ben Nicholson – video design
JT Rooney – video design
Todd LePere – video design
Omar Montes-Rangel – video engineer, video director
Eugene McAuliffe – video engineer
Live Nation – promoter
SJM Concerts – promoter
AEG, OCESA / Zignia Live – promoter
Dainty Group – promoter
The Blonds – costume design
Roberto Cavalli – costume design
Discount Universe – costume design
J&M Costumers – costume design
Nicolas Jebran – costume design
Alexis Mabille – costume design
Marco Marco – costume design
Fausto Puglisi – costume design
Jeremy Scott – costume design
Silvia's Costumers – costume design
Straight-Laced @ Runway Archives & Showroom – costume design
Todd Thomas – costume design
Valentino – costume design
Johnny Wujek – costume design
LaDuca Shoes – costume design
Leah Adler – dancer
Khasan Brailsford – dancer
Lockhart Brownlie – dancer
Bryan Gaw – dancer
Loriel Hennington – dancer
Malik LeNost – dancer
Scott Myrick – dancer
Cassidy Noblett – dancer
Tracy Shibata – dancer
Britt Stewart – dancer

Band 
Kris Pooley – musical director
Max Hart – keys
Casey Hooper – guitar
Nathan Spicer – guitar
Adam Marcello – drums
Joshua Moreau – bass
Lauren Ball – background vocals
Cherri Black – background vocals
The Last Night – remixer 
Jack Rayner – remixer

Credits adapted from The Prismatic World Tour program.

Notes

References 

Katy Perry concert tours
2014 concert tours
2015 concert tours
Concert tours of North America
Concert tours of the United States
Concert tours of Canada
Concert tours of Mexico
Concert tours of Europe
Concert tours of the United Kingdom
Concert tours of France
Concert tours of Germany
Concert tours of Ireland
Concert tours of Oceania
Concert tours of Australia
Concert tours of New Zealand
Concert tours of South America
Concert tours of Asia
Concert tours of Japan